An Amirul Hajj is a leader of Hajj pilgrims, appointed by the government body, Hajj commission or religious head.

Duties 

The duties of an Amirul Hajj include heading the Hajj pilgrimage, advising appropriate rules and regulation for performing Hajj, leading prayers, and overseeing grievances.

Notable Personalities 

The Sultan of Sokoto, Sa'ad Abubakar III was Amirul Hajj of Nigerians performing Hajj for 2013.
For the Dawoodi Bohra community, Mufaddal Saifuddin was the Amirul Haj in 2012, and his brother Malik ul Ashtar Shujauddin in 2019.
Former Governor of Kaduna State Abba Musa Rimi was appointed as Amirul Hajj for Nigerian Muslims in August 2013.

References

Islamic pilgrimages
Islamic honorifics